Speciesism: The Movie is a 2013 documentary film by American director Mark Devries. It explores the concept and practice of speciesism, the assignment of value to beings on the basis of species membership.

The film features interviews with, among others, Peter Singer, Richard Dawkins, Gary Francione, Temple Grandin, and Steven Best, along with material shot in and around factory farms in the United States.

See also 
 Animal rights
 Earthlings (film)
 List of vegan media
 Unity (film)
 Veganism

References

External links
 
 

2013 films
Documentary films about animal rights
American documentary films
2010s English-language films
2010s American films